Telo may refer to:

People 
 Christopher Telo, English-born Swedish footballer
 Mario Telò, Italian political scientist
 Michel Teló, Brazilian sertanejo singer-songwriter and actor

Others 
 Telo (woreda), one of the woredas in the Southern Nations, Nationalities, and Peoples' Region of Ethiopia
 Telo (mythology), a Celtic god, the eponymous spirit of Toulon in the Var
 Telo, Bokaro, a census town in Jharkhand, India

See also 
 Tamil Eelam Liberation Organization
 Tela (disambiguation)
 Telos (disambiguation)
 Telo mimetico, a military camouflage pattern used by the Italian Army for shelter-halves